Gharana Bullodu is a 1995 Telugu-language film directed by K. Raghavendra Rao and written by Vijayendra Prasad. It stars Nagarjuna, Ramya Krishna, Aamani playing the lead roles and music composed by M. M. Keeravani. The film was produced by K. Krishna Mohan Rao under RK Film Associates. The film was recorded as a Blockbuster Hit at the box office.

Cast

 Nagarjuna as Raju
 Ramya Krishna as Kanchukatla Papaji
 Aamani as Malli
 Srihari as Bhagvan's brother  
 Murali Mohan as Collector Raghuram, Papaji's father
 Kota Srinivasa Rao as Ammaji's husband
 Brahmanandam
 Sudhakar
 Nutan Prasad as Raghuram's father
 Tanikella Bharani
 AVS
 Dharmavarapu Subramanyam as Minister
 Mada Venkateswara Rao
 Mahesh Anand as Bhagvan
 Maganthi Sudhakar
 Jayachitra as Kanchukatla Ammaji
 Jayanthi as Sarada, Raghuram's mother
 Sudha as Papaji's mother

Soundtrack

The music was composed by M. M. Keeravani.

Release
The movie was later dubbed into Hindi as Rangeela Raja and into Tamil as Killadi Raja.

References

External links
 

1995 films
1990s Telugu-language films
Films directed by K. Raghavendra Rao
Films scored by M. M. Keeravani
Indian romantic comedy films
1995 romantic comedy films